Jones State Forest, officially known as L.R. Jones State Forest, covers  in Plainfield, Washington County in Vermont. The forest is managed by the Vermont Department of Forests, Parks, and Recreation.

Activities in the forest include hiking. The Spruce Mountain trail hikes up Spruce Mountain, a 3,037 foot peak, with a historic fire tower at the top.

References

External links
Official website

Vermont state forests
Protected areas of Washington County, Vermont
Plainfield, Vermont